"Lonely" is a song recorded by the German artist Nana. It was released in March 1997 as the second single from his debut album, Nana. The song reached number-one in Germany, Switzerland and Romania. It also reached the top 5 in Austria, Denmark, and Norway. On the Eurochart Hot 100, "Lonely" peaked at number 7. The chorus are sung by Aleksandra Jovanovic, Alexandra Prince and Jan van der Toorn.

Track listings
 CD maxi-single (Europe, 1997)
 "Lonely" (Radio Mix) - 3:51
 "Lonely" (Extended Mix) - 6:21
 "Lonely" (Club Remix) - 5:17

Music video
The music video was directed by Patric Ullaeus and premiered in April 1997.

Charts and sales

Weekly charts

Year-end charts

Certifications

References

1997 singles
Songs written by Toni Cottura
Number-one singles in Romania
1997 songs
Music videos directed by Patric Ullaeus
Songs written by Bülent Aris